Stibaera thyatiroides, the whaleback moth, is a species of moth in the family Noctuidae (the owlets). It was first described by William Barnes and Foster Hendrickson Benjamin in 1924 and it is found in North America.

The MONA or Hodges number for Stibaera thyatiroides is 9716.

References

Further reading

 
 
 

Condicinae
Articles created by Qbugbot
Moths described in 1924